Medieval theatre encompasses theatrical performance in the period between the fall of the Western Roman Empire in the 5th century and the beginning of the Renaissance in approximately the 15th century. The category of "medieval theatre" is vast, covering dramatic performance in Europe over a thousand-year period. A broad spectrum of genres needs to be considered, including mystery plays, morality plays, farces and masques. The themes were almost always religious. The most famous examples are the English cycle dramas, the York Mystery Plays, the Chester Mystery Plays, the Wakefield Mystery Plays, and the N-Town Plays, as well as the morality play known as Everyman. One of the first surviving secular plays in English is The Interlude of the Student and the Girl (c. 1300).

Due to a lack of surviving records and texts, low literacy in the general population, and the opposition of the clergy, there are few surviving sources from the Early and High Medieval periods. However, by the late period, performances began to become more secularized; larger number of records survive.

Difficulty of finding appropriate terms 
Because contemporary conceptions about theatre differ radically from the performance culture of the pre-modern world, it is difficult to find appropriate terms. First, "medieval" denotes a time period (500–1500) far too large and complex to understand in short descriptions. And within it, there was "a vast and varied spectrum of kinds of performances: ludus, jeu, ordo, representatio, officium, pagina, miraculum, mystère, processus, interlude, morality, mumming, disguising, and, of course, play." These had little to do with stage performance in the 21st century.

Transition from Rome, 500–900 A.D.
As the Western Roman Empire fell into severe decay through the 4th and 5th centuries A.D., the seat of Roman power shifted to Constantinople and the Eastern Roman Empire, later called the Byzantine Empire. While surviving evidence about Byzantine theatre is slight, existing records show that mime, pantomime, scenes or recitations from tragedies and comedies, dances, and other entertainments were very popular. Constantinople had two theatres that were in use as late as the 5th century A.D. However, the true importance of the Byzantines in theatrical history is their preservation of many classical Greek texts and the compilation of a massive encyclopedia called the Suda, from which is derived a large amount of contemporary information on Greek theatre. In the 6th century, the Emperor Justinian permanently closed the theatres.

Theatres were considered by many to be a diabolical threat to Christianity, especially because new converts continued to attend. Church fathers such as Tatian, Tertullian and Augustine characterized the stage as an instrument of corruption, while acting was considered sinful because its imitation of life was considered a mockery of God's creation. Roman actors were forbidden to have contact with Christian women, own slaves, or wear gold. They were officially excommunicated, denied the sacraments, including marriage and burial, and were defamed throughout Europe. For many centuries thereafter, clerics were cautioned to not allow travelling actors to perform in their jurisdiction.

Hrosvitha (c. 935-973), an aristocratic canoness and historian in northern Germany, wrote six plays modeled on Terence's comedies but using religious subjects in the 10th century. These six plays are the first known plays composed by a female dramatist and the first identifiable Western dramatic works of the post-Classical era. In order to preempt criticism from the Church, Hrosvitha declared that she sought to imitate the "laudable" deeds of women in Terence's plays and discard the "shameless" ones. They were first published in 1501 and had considerable influence in the sixteenth century. Another nun who wrote plays was the abbess Hildegard of Bingen (d. 1179), who wrote a drama called Ordo Virtutum in 1155.

Early Medieval theatre

Faced with the problem of explaining a new religion to a largely illiterate population, churches in the Early Middle Ages began staging dramatized versions of particular biblical events on specific days of the year. The dramatizations were included in order to vivify annual celebrations. Symbolic objects and actions (vestments, altars, censers, and pantomime performed by priests) recalled the events which Christian ritual celebrates. The Whom do you Seek (Quem-Quaeritis) Easter trope, dating from ca. 925, is an example of performing the events surround Christ's empty grave. The text was sung responsively by two groups and was not considered to be "acting" in the sense of impersonation. Sometime between 965 and 975, Æthelwold of Winchester composed the Regularis Concordia (Monastic Agreement) which contains a playlet complete with directions for performance.

The anonymous pagan play Querolus, written around 420, was adapted in the 12th century by Vitalis of Blois. Other secular Latin plays, such as Babio, were also written in the 12th century, mainly in France but also in England. It is also known that mimes, minstrels, bards, storytellers, and jugglers travelled in search of new audiences and financial support. Not much is known about these performers' repertoire. One of the most famous of the secular plays is the musical Le Jeu de Robin et Marion, written by Adam de la Halle in the 13th century, which is fully laid out in the original manuscript with lines, musical notation, and illuminations in the margins depicting the actors in motion. Adam also wrote other plays.

High and Late Medieval theatre

Performance of religious plays outside of the church began sometime in the 12th century through a traditionally accepted process of merging shorter dramas into longer plays, which were then translated into vernacular and performed by laymen, and thus accessible to a wider segment of society inclusive of the working class. The use of vernacular enabled drama to be understood and enjoyed by a larger audience. The Mystery of Adam (1150) gives credence to this theory, as its detailed stage direction suggest that it was staged outdoors. A number of other plays from the period survive, including La Seinte Resurrection (Norman), The Play of the Magi Kings (Spanish), and Sponsus (French).

The Feast of Fools was especially important in the development of comedy. The festival inverted the status of the lesser clergy and allowed them to ridicule their superiors and the routine of church life. Sometimes plays were staged as part of the occasion, and a certain amount of burlesque and comedy may have entered the liturgical drama as a result of its influence.

Economic and political changes in the High Middle Ages led to the formation of guilds and the growth of towns, and this would lead to significant changes for theatre starting in this time and continuing into in the Late Middle Ages. Trade guilds began to perform plays, usually religiously based, and often dealing with a biblical story that referenced their profession. For instance, a baker's guild would perform a reenactment of the Last Supper. In the British Isles, plays were produced in some 127 different towns during the Middle Ages. These vernacular "mystery plays" were written in cycles of a large number of plays: York (48 plays), Chester (24), Wakefield (32) and Unknown (42). A larger number of plays survive from France and Germany in this period, and some type of religious dramas were performed in nearly every European country in the Late Middle Ages. Many of these plays contained comedy, devils, villains and clowns.

The majority of actors in these plays were drawn from the local population. For example, at Valenciennes in 1547, more than 100 roles were assigned to 72 actors. Plays were staged on pageant wagon stages, which were platforms mounted on wheels used to move scenery. They allowed for abrupt changes in location. Often providing their own costumes, amateur performers in England were exclusively male, but other countries had female performers. Morality plays emerged as a distinct dramatic form around 1400 and flourished until 1550. One notable example is The Castle of Perseverance which depicts mankind's progress from birth to death. Though Everyman may possibly be the best known of this genre, it is atypical in many ways. Everyman receives Death's summons, struggles to escape and finally resigns himself to necessity. Along the way, he is deserted by Kindred, Goods, and Fellowship – only Good Deeds goes with him to the grave.

The earliest secular drama is The Play of the Greenwood by Adam de la Halle in 1276. It contains satirical scenes and folk material such as faeries and other supernatural occurrences. Farces also rose dramatically in popularity after the 13th century. The majority of these plays come from France and Germany and are similar in tone and form, emphasizing sex and bodily excretions. The best-known playwright of farces is Hans Sachs (1494–1576), who wrote 198 dramatic works. In England, The Second Shepherds' Play of the Wakefield Cycle is the best-known early farce. However, farce did not appear independently in England until the 16th century with the work of John Heywood (1497–1580).

A significant forerunner of the development of Elizabethan drama was the Chambers of Rhetoric in the Low Countries d Henry VII both maintained small companies of professional actors. Their plays were performed in the great hall of a nobleman's residence, often with a raised platform at one end for the audience and a "screen" at the other for the actors. Also important were Mummers' plays, performed during the Christmas season, and court masques. These masques were especially popular during the reign of Henry VIII, who had a house of revels built and an office of revels established in 1545.

Changes in the Early Modern Period
Changing political and economic factors greatly affected theatre at the end of the Middle Ages and beginning of the Modern Era. First, the Protestant Reformation targeted the theatre, especially in England, in an effort to stamp out allegiance to Rome. In Wakefield, for example, the local mystery cycle text shows signs of Protestant editing, with references to the pope crossed out. It was not just Protestants who attacked the theatre: The Council of Trent banned religious plays in an attempt to rein in the extrabiblical material.

A revival of interest in ancient Roman and Greek culture changed the tastes of the learned classes in the performing arts. Greek and Roman plays were performed and new plays were written that were heavily influenced by the classical style. This led to the creation of Commedia dell'arte and influenced Renaissance theatre.

A change of patronage also caused drastic changes to the theatre. In England, the monarch and nobility started to support professional theatre troupes (including Shakespeare's Lord Chamberlain's Men and King's Men), which catered to their upper-class patrons' tastes.

Finally, the construction of permanent theaters, such as The Theatre, signaled a major turning point. Permanent theaters allowed for more sophisticated staging and storytelling.

Modern productions of Medieval theatre

Mummers plays
Mummers plays are still performed regularly throughout the United Kingdom as well as the U.S., such as the annual Mummers Parade in Philadelphia. What relation they may bear to their medieval antecedents is unknown. The surviving texts of this oral tradition were recorded in the 18th century, at a time when the Industrial Revolution began to break up the rural communities in which the plays were performed.

Mystery plays
Mystery plays are still produced regularly throughout the United Kingdom. The local cycles were revived in both York and Chester in 1951 as part of the Festival of Britain, and are still performed by the local guilds. The N-Town cycle was revived in 1978 as the Lincoln mystery plays,
 and in 1994 the Lichfield Mysteries were inaugurated (now the largest community theatre event in the United Kingdom).

In 1977, the National Theatre commissioned Tony Harrison to create The Mysteries, a re-working of the Wakefield Cycle and others. It was revived in 1985 (whereupon the production was filmed for Channel 4 Television), and again as a part of the theatre's millennium celebration in 2000. The productions won Bill Bryden the "Best Director" title in both the Evening Standard Theatre Awards and the Olivier Awards for 1985, the year the three plays first appeared together in performance at the Lyceum Theatre. An adaptation of Harrison's play was staged at Shakespeare's Globe in 2011 as The Globe Mysteries.

In 2001, the Isango Ensemble produced an African version of the Chester Cycle at the Garrick Theatre in London as The Mysteries – Yiimimangaliso, performing in a combination of Xhosa, Zulu, English, Latin and Afrikaans. They revived an adapted version of the production at Shakespeare's Globe in 2015 as The Mysteries. In 2004, two mystery plays (one focusing on the Creation and the other on the Passion) were performed at Canterbury Cathedral, with actor Edward Woodward in the role of God. The large cast also included Daniel MacPherson, Thomas James Longley and Joseph McManners.

Morality plays
The first modern stage production of Everyman did not appear until July 1901, when The Elizabethan Stage Society of William Poel gave three outdoor performances at the Charterhouse in London. Poel then partnered with British actor Ben Greet to produce the play throughout Britain, with runs on the American Broadway stage from 1902 to 1918, and concurrent tours throughout North America. These productions differed from past performances in that women were cast in the title role, rather than men. Film adaptations of the 1901 version of the play appeared in 1913 and 1914, with the 1913 film being presented with an early color two-process pioneered by Kinemacolor.

Another well-known version of the play is Jedermann by the Austrian playwright Hugo von Hofmannsthal, which has been performed annually at the Salzburg Festival since 1920. The play was made into a film of the same title in 1961. A direct-to-video movie version of Everyman was made in 2002, directed by John Farrell, which updated the setting to the early 21st century. An adaptation by Carol Ann Duffy, the British Poet Laureate, was performed at the National Theatre (UK) in 2015 with Chiwetel Ejiofor in the title role.

Miracle plays
Performances of Christ's Nativity are frequent during the Christmas season, and many schools and Sunday school groups regularly perform scenes from the bible with children. The reenactment of Jesus Christ's Passion is performed throughout the world in Lent.

See also
Wakefield Mystery Plays
The Second Shepherds' Play
History of theatre
Medieval French literature
Carnival
The Vice

Notes

Sources

 Bate, Keith, ed. 1976. Three Latin Comedies. Toronto: Centre for Medieval Studies.
 Brockett, Oscar G. and Franklin J. Hildy. 2003. History of the Theatre. Ninth edition, International edition. Boston: Allyn and Bacon. .
 Cohen, Robert. 2000. Theatre: Brief Edition. Mayfield: McGraw-Hill. .
 Hannant, Sara. 2011. Mummers, Maypoles and Milkmaids: A Journey Through the English Ritual Year. London: Merrell. .
 Klaus, Carl H., Miriam Gilbert, and Braford S. Field, Jr. 1991. "Stages of Drama." New York: St. Martin's.
 Knight, Alan E. 1983. "Aspects of Genre in Late Medieval French Drama." Manchester University Press.
 McAlister, Linda. 1996. "Hypatia's Daughters: 1500 Years of Women Philosophers." Hypatia Inc.
 Nelson, Alan H. 1972. "Some Configurations of Staging in Medieval English Drama" Medieval English Drama: Essays Critical and Contextual Chicago: University of Chicago Press. 116–147.
 Styan, J.L. 1996. The English Stage: A History of Drama and Performance. Cambridge: Cambridge University Press. .
 Symes, Carol. 2007. A Common Stage: Theatre and Public Life in Medieval Arras. Ithaca: Cornell University Press. .
 Walsh, Martin. 2002. "Drama." Medieval Folklore: A Guide to Myths, Legends, Tales, Beliefs, and Customs. Oxford: Oxford University Press. .
 Wise, Jennifer and Craig S. Walker, eds. 2003. The Broadview Anthology of Drama: Plays from the Western Theatre, Volume 1. Toronto: Braodview Press.

History of theatre
 
Medieval literature
Theatrical genres